Tangier Ibn Battuta Airport  is an international airport serving Tangier (Tanger in French), the capital city of the Tanger-Tetouan-Al Hoceima region in Morocco. The airport is named after Ibn Battouta (1304–1368), a Moroccan traveler who was born in Tangier. The airport was formerly known as Tanger-Boukhalef Airport. The airport handled over  passengers in the year 2017.

Facilities

A new airport terminal building was opened in 2008 to provide for many more flights and increased passenger capability, as Tangier has grown rapidly and modernised.

Aircraft parking space of  supports up to four Boeing 737s and one Boeing 747. For small craft two dedicated sections are assigned.

The airport has two runways but only the longer runway is in active use and 07/25 is closed. The 3500 meter long runway 10/28 is open and is capable of handling all sizes of aircraft up to the size of a Boeing 747 and Airbus A380-800.

The airport has an ILS status (Loc – Glide – DME) and offers the following radionavigational aids: VOR – DME – NDB. PAPI lighting available for runway 10/28 for approaches from either direction.

Tangier-Ibn Battouta is one of the six airports in Morocco where ONDA offers its special VIP service Salon Convives de Marque.

Airlines and destinations

Passenger
The following airlines operate regular scheduled and charter flights at Tangier Airport:

 This flight operates via Nador. However, this carrier does not have rights to transport passengers solely between Tangier and Nador. 
 This flight operates via Fez on selected days. However, this carrier does not have rights to transport passengers solely between Tangier and Fez.

Cargo

Statistics

Access
Tangier-Ibn Battouta is served by a dedicated taxi stand. Grand Taxis are available 24 hours a day at the curb in front of the terminal. The price of these taxis is fixed by the Moroccan Government. There are no bus routes that serve the airport directly. Small local taxis may drop off passengers but are forbidden from picking up at the terminal.

Incidents and accidents
On 13 October 1953, one passenger died on a domestic flight to Casablanca. During initial climb from Tanger the plane encountered unknown problems and made an emergency landing on a beach. The aircraft was damaged beyond repair.
On 23 December 1973, a Sud Aviation Caravelle on lease to Royal Air Maroc crashed near the airport after the pilot turned too far to the East in his approach to runway 28. In dark and rainy conditions the plane overflew dangerous terrain and crashed into mountains. All 106 on board died.
On 23 November 1988, Vickers Viscount G-BBVH of Gibraltar Airways was damaged beyond economic repair in a landing accident.

References

External links
 Tanger page at ONDA website
 

Airports in Morocco
Buildings and structures in Tanger-Tetouan-Al Hoceima
Transport in Tangier